Racing Club Mechelen, or Racing Club Malines, was a Belgian professional basketball club from the city of Mechelen, Belgium. It was the men's basketball section of K.R.C. Mechelen. For sponsorship reasons, the club was also known as Maes Pils for a long time.

History
R.C. Mechelen folded and merged with Sobabee to create Racing Basket Antwerpen, in 1995. Until it was dissolved, the club's senior team was the most successful Belgian basketball club, after having won a total of 15 Belgian national championships, 9 Belgian Cups, and 5 Belgian SuperCups.

Arena
R.C. Mechelen played its home games in Mechelen, at the Winketkaai arena.

Titles and honors

Domestic competitions
 Belgian League
 Champions (15): 1964–65, 1965–66, 1966–67, 1968–69, 1973–74, 1974–75, 1975–76, 1979–80, 1986–87, 1988–89, 1989–90, 1990–91, 1991–92, 1992–93, 1993–94
 Belgian Cup
 Winners (9): 1963–64, 1964–65, 1969–70, 1970–71, 1985–86, 1986–87, 1989–90, 1992–93, 1993–94
 Belgian Supercup
 Winners (5): 1990, 1991, 1992, 1993, 1994

European competitions
 FIBA Korać Cup
 Runners-up (1): 1973

In European and worldwide competitions

Notable players

 Jim Fox 1966–1967
 Teófilo Cruz 1969–1970
 Ronny Bayer 1985–1990
 Éric Struelens 1988–1995
 Bill Varner 1988–1995
 Jacques Stas 1992–1995
 Rick Raivio 1985–1987
 Rik Samaey 1985–1990

References

Basketball teams established in 1940
Defunct basketball teams in Belgium
Sports clubs disestablished in 1995
R.C. Mechelen (basketball)